Maithon Gas Turbine Station is a gas-based thermal power plant located at Maithon in Dhanbad district in the Indian state of Jharkhand. The power plant is owned Damodar Valley Corporation.

Capacity
It has an installed capacity of 82.5 MW.

References

Natural gas-fired power stations in Jharkhand
Dhanbad district
1989 establishments in Bihar
Energy infrastructure completed in 1989
20th-century architecture in India